Oscar Kjellberg (21 September 1870 – 5 July 1931) was a Swedish inventor and industrialist. He founded Elektriska Svetsnings-Aktiebolaget (ESAB) in 1904 and Kjellberg Finsterwalde in 1922. He invented the coated electrode used in manual metal arc welding (Swedish Patent: 27152, June 29, 1907), by dipping a bare iron wire in a thick mixture of carbonates and silicates.  The purpose of the coating is to generate a fume cloud that protects the molten metal from reacting with the oxygen and nitrogen (as is present in the ambient atmosphere) during the brief period of time that the metal requires to cool and solidify.  His pioneering work in covered electrode development paved the road during the next twenty years in the research of reliable flux-coated welding electrodes.

External links 
Esab - Company founded by Oscar Kjellberg in 1922 Official site
Kjellberg Finsterwalde - Official site

20th-century Swedish inventors
1870 births
1931 deaths